Quba District is one of the 66 districts of Azerbaijan. It is located in the north-east of the country and belongs to the Guba-Khachmaz Economic Region. The district borders the districts of Qusar, Qabala, Ismayilli, Shamakhi, Shabran, and Khachmaz. Its capital and largest city is Quba. As of 2020, the district had a population of 173,400.

The fertile region surrounding Quba is best known for its production of apples and the city area of Quba is known for its fine carpets.

History 
Quba rose to prominence in the 18th century. In 1747, Nader Shah ruler of the Afsharid Dynasty was assassinated. That same year, Hussein-Ali, the Shah's designated ruler of the region, decided to attempt to unify the Azeri khanates as an independent kingdom. One of his first moves was to relocate his capital from the less defensible Xudat in the Caspian lowlands to Quba where he built a fortress. Hussein-Ali died in 1757 and his son Fatali Khan carried on the expansion with Quba reaping the riches of its status as the capital. Some ruins from this period, such as Çirax Qala on the way to Baku, exist today.

However, upon Fatali Khan's death in 1789, the city's fortunes began to turn. In 1806, the khanate was occupied and soon absorbed by the Russian Empire. As a result, the city fell into the background of Azerbaijani history and politics.

The city is home to several historic buildings, including the Juma Mosque (Cuma Məscid or Friday Mosque), Ardabil Mosque (Ərdəbil Məscid) and old hamman (baths).

The region is home to Azerbaijan's largest community of Mountain Jews in the community of Qırmızı Qəsəbə (formerly in), located just across the river from Quba City.

Agriculture of Quba 
Guba region has been known for its fruitful gardens since the Soviet era. According to the annual report of the Azerbaijan Statistical Committee, the apple orchards in the Guba-Khachmaz economic region covers nearly 22,000 hectares. About 14,000 hectares of these are in the Guba district.

Apple festival 

Since 2012, every year an apple festival is held in Guba. Compositions, national dances reflecting Azerbaijani custom and traditions, different types of apples, sweets and drinks prepared from apple are demonstrated at the ceremony. Various competitions are held among the gardeners at the "Apple Festival".

Historical and architectural monuments 

There are 134 historical and archaeological monuments in the Quba district. These include the temple of fire worshipers near the village of Khinalig, the Mausoleums of Aghbil dating back to the 16th century, the Sakina Khanum mosque, the Juma mosque, Ardabil mosque, which dates back to the 19th century.

Demographics 
Azerbaijanis (All parts of district) - 79.22%, Tats (Southern parts) - 9.10% and Lezgians (Northwestern parts) - 5.87
% are the largest ethnic groups of Quba District. Khinalugs (1.43%) are living in the village of Khinalug.
Buduq (Budukh).

Languages
Azeri (mother tongue of 86% of the population)
Lezgi
Tati (Judeo-Tat)
Khinalug
Buduq

Population 
According to the Statistical Committee of the Republic, the number total of the population was 137,8 thousand in 2000. This figure increased by approximately 32.2 thousand and reached 170 thousand In 2018.

General information

Healthcare 
There are Central hospital, Regional Perinatal Center, regional Diagnostic center of Guba, rehabilitation centers, center of Hygiene and Epidemiology, Guba Branch of the Scientific Research Institute of Hematology and Transfusiology named after B. Eyvazov, 91 medical stations.

Names of large settlements

Education 
There are 155 educational institutions, 135 secondary schools, 15 preschools and 5 kindergartens in the district. There is also a branch of the Azerbaijan State Pedagogical University, Guba Social-Economic College, Medical College, Vocational High School, Private Vocational School.

Notable natives 
 Abbasgulu Bakikhanov (also spelt Bakixanov or Bakikhanli), a 19th-century writer, historian and philosopher, who lived in the village of Amsar located in 6 km far from Quba city. His museum is located in Quba city.
 Sakina Akhundzadeh, playwright, was born here in 1865

Gallery

References 

 
Districts of Azerbaijan